The Schengen Agreement is a treaty which led to the creation of Europe's Schengen Area, in which internal border checks have largely been abolished. It was signed on 14 June 1985, near the town of Schengen, Luxembourg, by five of the ten member states of the then European Economic Community. It proposed measures intended to gradually abolish border checks at the signatories' common borders, including reduced-speed vehicle checks which allowed vehicles to cross borders without stopping, allowing residents in border areas freedom to cross borders away from fixed checkpoints, and the harmonisation of visa policies.

In 1990, the Agreement was supplemented by the Schengen Convention which proposed the complete abolition of systematic internal border controls and a common visa policy. The Schengen Area operates very much like a single state for international travel purposes with external border controls for travellers entering and exiting the area, and common visas, but with no internal border controls. It currently consists of 27 European countries covering a population of over 400 million people and an area of 4,312,099 square kilometres (1,664,911 sq mi).

Originally, the Schengen treaties and the rules adopted under them operated independently from the European Union. However, in 1999 they were incorporated into European Union law by the Amsterdam Treaty, while providing opt-outs for the only two EU member states that had remained outside the Area: Ireland and the United Kingdom (which subsequently withdrew from the EU in 2020). Schengen is now a core part of EU law, and all EU member states without an opt-out which have not already joined the Schengen Area are legally obliged to do so when technical requirements have been met. Several non-EU countries are included in the area through special association agreements.

History

Free movement of people was a core part of the original Treaty of Rome and, from the early days of the European Economic Community, nationals of EEC member states could travel freely from one member state to another on production of their passports or national identity cards. However, systematic identity controls were still in place at the border between most member states.

Disagreement between member states led to an impasse on the abolition of border controls within the Community, but in 1985 five of the then ten member states – Belgium, France, Luxembourg, the Netherlands, and West Germany – signed an agreement on the gradual abolition of common border controls. The agreement was signed on the Princess Marie-Astrid boat on the river Moselle near the town of Schengen, Luxembourg, where the territories of France, Germany and Luxembourg meet. Three of the signatories, Belgium, Luxembourg, and the Netherlands, had already abolished common border controls as part of the Benelux Economic Union.

The Schengen Agreement was signed independently of the European Union, in part owing to the lack of consensus amongst EU member states over whether or not the EU had the jurisdiction to abolish border controls, and in part because those ready to implement the idea did not wish to wait for others (at this time there was no enhanced co-operation mechanism). The Agreement provided for harmonisation of visa policies, allowing residents in border areas the freedom to cross borders away from fixed checkpoints, the replacement of passport checks with visual surveillance of vehicles at reduced speed, and vehicle checks that allowed vehicles to cross borders without stopping.

In 1990, the Agreement was supplemented by the Schengen Convention which proposed the abolition of internal border controls and a common visa policy. It was this Convention that created the Schengen Area through the complete abolition of border controls between Schengen member states, common rules on visas, and police and judicial cooperation.

The Schengen Agreement and its implementing Convention were enacted in 1995 only for some signatories, but just over two years later during the Amsterdam Intergovernmental Conference, all European Union member states except the United Kingdom and Ireland had signed the Agreement. It was during those negotiations, which led to the Amsterdam Treaty, that the incorporation of the Schengen acquis into the main body of European Union law was agreed along with opt-outs for Ireland and the United Kingdom (which subsequently withdrew from the EU in 2020), which were to remain outside of the Schengen Area.

In December 1996 two non-EU member states, Norway and Iceland, signed an association agreement with the signatories of the Agreement to become part of the Schengen Area. While this agreement never came into force, both countries did become part of the Schengen Area after concluding similar agreements with the EU. The Schengen Convention itself was not open for signature by non-EU member states. In 2009, Switzerland finalised its official entry to the Schengen Area with the acceptance of an association agreement by popular referendum in 2005.

Now that the Schengen Agreement is part of the acquis communautaire, it has, for EU members, lost the status of a treaty, which could only be amended according to its terms. Instead, amendments are made according to the legislative procedure of the EU under EU treaties. Ratification by the former agreement signatory states is not required for altering or repealing some or all of the former Schengen acquis. Legal acts setting out the conditions for entry into the Schengen Area are now made by majority vote in the EU's legislative bodies. New EU member states do not sign the Schengen Agreement as such, instead being bound to implement the Schengen rules as part of the pre-existing body of EU law, which every new entrant is required to accept.

This situation means that non-EU Schengen member states have few formally binding options to influence the shaping and evolution of Schengen rules; their options are effectively reduced to agreeing or withdrawing from the agreement. However, consultations with affected countries are conducted prior to the adoption of particular new legislation.

In 2016, border controls were temporarily reintroduced in seven Schengen countries (Austria, Denmark, France, Germany, Norway, Poland, and Sweden) in response to the European migrant crisis.

Portugal has since reintroduced checks several times along its border with Spain, during the UEFA Euro 2004 championships and when Portugal hosted the NATO 2010 Lisbon summit. Portugal also reintroduced border checks from 10 May 2017 to 14 May 2017, during Pope Francis's visit to Fátima, Portugal.

Border controls were reintroduced throughout the area during the COVID-19 pandemic.

On December 8, 2022 the Justice and Home Affairs Council voted to add Croatia to the Schengen Area but rejected Romania and Bulgaria. Austria and the Netherlands voted against the inclusion of Romania and Bulgaria with Austria claiming that there has been a rapid increase in the number of migrants using the West Balkan route to enter the EU illegally.

See also
 Central America-4 Border Control Agreement
 eu-LISA
 European Neighbourhood Policy
 Internal market
 Prüm Convention

References

External links

 Agreement between the Governments of the States of the Benelux Economic Union, the Federal Republic of Germany and the French Republic on the gradual abolition of checks at their common borders – The Schengen Agreement
 Convention implementing the Schengen Agreement of 14 June 1985 between the Governments of the States of the Benelux Economic Union, the Federal Republic of Germany and the French Republic on the gradual abolition of checks at their common borders – Convention implementing the Schengen Agreement
 Schengen – eurotopics
 The Schengen Area: collection of resources (texts, images, videos,...) – CVCE – Virtual Resource Centre for Knowledge about Europe
 The Schengen Acquis – EUR-Lex

Agreement
Schengen, Luxembourg
European Union law
Terminated or expired founding treaties of the European Union
International travel documents
Treaties concluded in 1985
1985 in the European Economic Community
Law enforcement in Europe
Boundary treaties
International border crossings
European Economic Area
1985 in economics
1985 in international relations
Freedom of movement